The following is a list of squads for each nation competing at the 2020 European Women's Handball Championship.

Each squad consisted of 16 players, with a maximum of six players who could be replaced during the tournament. However, in regard to the COVID-19 pandemic and the potential risk of several players from the same team testing positive, there was no limit to the number of replacements for players testing positive.

Age, caps and goals correct as of 3 December 2020.

Group A

Denmark
The squad was announced on 10 November 2020. On 26 November, Laura Damgaard replaced Helena Elver in the squad due to a serious knee injury. On 28 November, Rikke Poulsen was added to the squad as a back-up.

Head coach: Jesper Jensen

France
A 19-player squad was announced on 17 November 2020. On 28 November, 20 players were included in the squad.

Head coach: Olivier Krumbholz

Montenegro
A 19-player squad was announced on 18 November 2020. The final roster was revealed on 1 December.

Head coach:  Kim Rasmussen

Slovenia
A 20-player squad was announced on 16 November 2020. It was reduced to 19 players on 26 November.

Head coach: Uroš Bregar

Group B

Czech Republic
A 23-player squad was announced on 28 November 2020. It was reduced to 18 players on 30 November.

Head coach: Jan Bašný

Russia
An 18-player squad was announced on 17 November 2020. On 24 November, Valeriia Maslova replaced Anna Vyakhireva in the squad due to a back injury.

Head coach:  Ambros Martín

Spain
The squad was announced on 18 November 2020.

Head coach: Carlos Viver

Sweden
A 19-player squad was announced on 27 October 2020. On 20 November, Elin Hansson replaced Hanna Blomstrand in the squad due to an injury. On 30 November, the squad was reduced to 17 players, including Evelina Eriksson traveling with the team as a back-up.

Head coach: Tomas Axnér

Group C

Croatia
A 22-player squad was announced on 10 November 2020. The roster of 18 players was revealed on 2 December.

Head coach: Nenad Šoštarić

Hungary
A 20-player squad was announced on 22 November 2020. On 26 November, the squad was reduced to 19 players.

Head coach: Gábor Danyi & Gábor Elek

Netherlands
An 18-player squad was announced on 9 November 2020.

Head coach:  Emmanuel Mayonnade

Serbia
A 22-player squad was announced on 10 November 2020.

Head coach: Ljubomir Obradović

Group D

Germany
An 18-player squad was announced on 23 November 2020. On 26 November, Annika Lott replaced Mia Zschocke due to an injury.

Head coach:  Henk Groener

Norway
The squad was announced on 10 November 2020. On 28 November, Katrine Lunde was added to the squad due to Silje Solberg still not testing negative for COVID-19. On 2 December, Rikke Granlund replaced Silje Solberg in the squad, while waiting for Solberg testing negative for COVID-19. On 7 December, Katrine Lunde replaced Emily Stang Sando in the squad. On 12 December, Silje Solberg replaced Rikke Granlund in the squad. On 15 December, Marta Tomac replaced Veronica Kristiansen in the squad. On 18 December, Veronica Kristiansen replaced Marta Tomac in the squad.

Head coach:  Thorir Hergeirsson

Poland
A 22-player squad was announced on 23 November 2020. It was reduced to 17 players on 30 November. Joanna Wołoszyk replaced Sylwia Matuszczyk on 30 November.

Head coach:  Arne Senstad

Romania
A 21-player squad was announced on 16 November 2020. Later, Alexandra Subțirică replaced injured Raluca Băcăoanu in the squad. On 29 November, the squad was reduced to 18 players and Crina Pintea became first Romanian player to miss the tournament due to the COVID-19 pandemic. On 1 December, Laura Moisă also tested positive for COVID-19.

Head coach: Bogdan Burcea

References

squads
European Handball Championship squads